= The Descent of the Dove =

The Descent of the Dove may refer to:

- The Descent of the Dove: A Short History of the Holy Spirit in the Church, a 1939 theological treatise by Charles Williams
- Descent of the Holy Spirit, a Christian theological concept referring to the events of Pentecost
